Governor Stephen may refer to:

James Stephen (civil servant) (1789–1859), Acting Governor of Gibraltar from 1875 to 1876, and in 1878
George Milner Stephen (1812–1894), Acting Governor of South Australia in 1838
Ninian Stephen (1923–2017), 20th Governor-General of Australia from 1982 to 1989

See also
Governor Stephens (disambiguation)